Selçuk Aydın (born 4 September 1983) is a Turkish professional boxer. He held the European welterweight title from 2009 to 2010, the WBC Silver welterweight title from 2010 to 2012, and has challenged once for the WBC interim welterweight title in 2012. As an amateur he won several medals at the European and European Union Championships, all in the lightweight division.

Amateur career
As an amateur he fought as a teenager at bantamweight where he won the European U17 title in 1999 and as a senior in the lightweight (60 kg) category where he won the European junior title in 2001. At senior level he won bronze in 2002 and a silver medal at the 2004 European Amateur Boxing Championships in Pula, Croatia where he lost to Dimitar Shtilianov. 2003 at the world championships he lost his second fight against Thai Pichai Sayotha.

Aydın won the 2004 World University Boxing Championships and also participated at the 2004 Summer Olympics in Athens, Greece but was eliminated in the first round by Shtilianov.

He was more successful at the 2005 Mediterranean Games in Almería, Spain and won the silver medal, at the World Championships 2005  he lost his third bout to Jong Sub-Baik. The short-tempered Aydin was suspended for several years after hitting a referee and turned pro.

Professional career 
Selcuk Aydin's professional debut was against Marian Gabris and knocked him out in the 1st round with 1 minute 31 seconds in. He then fought various other fighters. His first major fight for a title was against Lucky Lewele for the vacant WBC International welterweight title. He defeated him with a unanimous decision to gain the title. He then defended his title against Marat Khuzeev, Luis Hernandez, Said Ouali and Jackson Osei Bonsu. On June 5, 2010 Selcuk had a bout with Jo Jo Dan for the vacant WBC Silver welterweight title. He defeated Jo Jo Dan with a controversial split decision to win and nab himself the WBC Silver welterweight title. He would then go onto defeat Jo Jo Dan again via controversial decision in a re-match over a year later on November 26, 2011.

Selcuk Aydin vs. Robert Guerrero 
On 28 July 2012 Selcuk Aydin faced Robert Guerrero for the interim WBC Welterweight Title. It was by far Selcuk's most important fight in his career at this point. Robert Guerrero was shown as a clear favourite for this fight. The fight lasted the full 12 rounds and Robert Guerrero won with a unanimous decision with the referee's scoring it 117-111, 116-112, 116-112. After the fight Selcuk Aydin was interviewed and said he had been ripped off by not being given this chance when he was first declared the mandatory contender to fight for the belt and said since then he has lost his will and energy.

Selcuk Aydin vs. Jesus Soto Karass 

After suffering the first loss of his career against Robert Guerrero, Aydin returned to the ring for a 10-round fight with Jesus Soto Karass on January 26, 2013. The fight went the distance, where Soto Karass was awarded a majority decision victory.

Selcuk Aydin vs. DeMarcus Corley 

Following an eighth-round KO victory over Aaron Herrera two months earlier, Aydin then went on to face DeMarcus Corley on September 27, 2013. Aydin won by TKO in the fifth round when Corley was unable to continue and decided to quit in the process.

Postol vs. Aydin 

Aydin fought against Ukrainian undefeated boxer Postol for title elimination in U.S and lost this match by KO in round 11.

Ring return 

In the fifth round, Selcuk Aydin won by TKO against Nodar Robakidze.

Professional boxing record

References

External links

1983 births
Living people
Fenerbahçe boxers
Olympic boxers of Turkey
Boxers at the 2004 Summer Olympics
Light-welterweight boxers
Welterweight boxers
Turkish male boxers
European champions for Turkey
European Boxing Union champions
Mediterranean Games silver medalists for Turkey
Competitors at the 2005 Mediterranean Games
Lightweight boxers
Mediterranean Games medalists in boxing
21st-century Turkish people